The chestnut-striped opossum (Monodelphis rubida) is an opossum species from South America. It is found in Brazil. More specifically, it is found in East and Central Brazil, including areas such as Goiás, Minas Gerais, and São Paulo.  It is terrestrial and is active around twilight. There has been a population depletion of about 20% in the last 10 years due to deforestation and habitat loss. It is nearing Threatened, but the exact number of their species in unknown.

References

Opossums
Marsupials of South America
Endemic fauna of Brazil
Mammals of Brazil
Mammals described in 1936
Taxa named by Oldfield Thomas
Taxobox binomials not recognized by IUCN